is a Japanese manga series written and illustrated by Yuki Shiwasu. It was originally a one-shot published in Hakusensha's shōjo manga magazine Hana to Yume in August 2021, before being serialized in the same magazine from October of the same year.

Publication
Written and illustrated by Yuki Shiwasu, Tamon's B-Side was initially a one-shot published in Hakusensha's Hana to Yume magazine on August 5, 2021. It began its serialization in the same magazine on October 20 of the same year. As of February 2023, four tankōbon volumes have been released.

In February 2023, Viz Media announced that they licensed the series for English publication, with the first volume set to be released in Q4 2023.

Other media
A voice drama adaptation, featuring the voices of Takuya Eguchi, Toshiki Masuda, and =Love member Maika Sasaki, was included in an issue of Hana to Yume published on October 20, 2022.

Reception
In 2022, Tamon's B-Side was nominated in the Next Manga Awards in the Print Manga category, where it placed 11th out of 50 nominees. The series ranked ninth in the 2023 edition of Takarajimasha's Kono Manga ga Sugoi! list of best manga for female readers. It also ranked fourth in the "Nationwide Publishers Recommended Comics of 2023" list.

See also
Takane and Hana, another manga series by the same author

References

External links
  
 

Hakusensha manga
Japanese idols in anime and manga
Romantic comedy anime and manga
Shōjo manga
Viz Media manga